Niels van der Kolk (born 7 October 1970) is a Dutch water polo player. He competed in the men's tournament at the 1996 Summer Olympics.

References

1970 births
Living people
Dutch male water polo players
Olympic water polo players of the Netherlands
Water polo players at the 1996 Summer Olympics
People from Veenendaal
Sportspeople from Utrecht (province)
20th-century Dutch people